Amirabad (also Romanized as Amīrābād) is a village in Qanatghestan Rural District, Mahan District, Kerman County, Kerman Province, Iran. At the 2006 census, its population was 29, in 10 families.

References 

Populated places in Kerman County